The Hitcher is a 2007 American road thriller film starring Sean Bean, Sophia Bush and Zachary Knighton. It is a remake of the 1986 film of the same name starring Rutger Hauer, C. Thomas Howell, and Jennifer Jason Leigh. The Hitcher was directed by Dave Meyers and produced by Michael Bay’s production company Platinum Dunes.

Plot
College students, Jim Halsey (Zachary Knighton) and Grace Andrews (Sophia Bush) are driving across New Mexico to meet their friends for the spring break. On their first night of driving, they nearly hit a hitchhiker (Sean Bean), who is standing in the middle of the road. Jim swerves and the car spins out of control to a stop. As the man approaches, Grace insists that someone else will stop to help him, and they take off.

Later that night at a gas station, Jim meets the hitchhiker, who introduces himself as John Ryder and asks for a ride. Reluctantly, Jim agrees. While on the road, he becomes increasingly violent and attacks them, holding a knife to Grace's eye. He tells Jim the only way to save them both is to say "I want to die". Jim hits the brakes, causing John to hit his head on the windshield, and then, Jim kicks him out of the car. Grace tells Jim she wants to go home but he persuades her to continue with their trip.

The following day, Jim and Grace spot John in a family's car. The two try to warn the family but crash their car. They are forced to continue on foot and eventually find the family's car on the side of the road; both the children and mother are already dead, with the father badly wounded. They take the car and stop at a nearby cafe to tend to the wound, but the man dies.

Suspected of having committed the murders, Jim and Grace are arrested and brought to the police station. John arrives shortly after and kills everyone at the station, while Jim and Grace flee. Lieutenant Esteridge has the rest of the station pursue the couple, but John shows up and single-handedly takes out all of the police cruisers and a helicopter, helping Jim and Grace escape the police.

Grace and Jim check in at a motel. Grace falls asleep but is woken by John, who attempts to sexually assault her. She fights him off and hides in the bathroom. John disappears so Grace leaves the motel to look for Jim, and finds him chained at the wrists and ankles between a truck and a trailer. Grace approaches the truck, which is being revved up by John, and demands that he stop. The police arrive and tell her to drop her gun, as John drives forward and splits Jim in half, killing him. John is then apprehended by the police.

The next morning, Lt. Esteridge tells Grace that the real John Ryder is missing and they do not know the true identity of the hitchhiker. He informs her the hitchhiker will be transported across the state to another prison. During the journey, the hitchhiker breaks free from his restraints and kills everyone in the police van, causing the vehicle to crash, with Lt. Esteridge and Grace crashing close behind them. The hitchhiker shoots a pool of gasoline igniting it  with Estridge's handgun which Grace took from Estridge, then Grace went to search for and kill the hitchhiker, but was surprised, disarmed, then thrown into the van and trapped by the hitchhiker, but then Grace manages to escape from the van. The hitchhiker shoots and kills Lt. Esteridge with his own gun, who is injured and trapped in the car. Grace shoots the hitchhiker in the back with a shotgun and then in the chest. The hitchhiker asks her, "Feels good, doesn't it?" to which she replies, "I don't feel a thing," before she shoots him in the head execution style.

Cast
 Sean Bean as John Ryder / The Hitchhiker 
 Sophia Bush as Grace Andrews
 Zachary Knighton as Jim Halsey
 Neal McDonough as Lieutenant Esteridge
 Kyle Davis as Buford's Store Clerk
 Skip O'Brien as Harlan Bremmer Sr., Sheriff of Torrance County
 Travis Schuldt as Deputy Harlan Bremmer Jr.
 Danny Bolero as Officer Edwards
 Lauren Cohn as Marlene
 Yara Martinez as Beth
 Jeffrey Hutchinson as Young Father

Production

The Hitcher is a remake of the 1986 film of the same name. It is the third remake of a horror film to be produced by Michael Bay's Platinum Dunes, following the commercially successful films The Texas Chainsaw Massacre (2003) and The Amityville Horror (2005). Bay said of the original: "I loved it as a kid, and we can add some cool twists and turn it into a rocking film". Bay also suggested that the protagonist in the remake would be female. Dave Meyers was hired to direct the remake. Sean Bean and Sophia Bush were cast in January 2006; in June, Zachary Knighton joined the project. Production began in June.

Release

Theatrical 
The Hitcher held a special screening on January 18, 2007 at the ArcLight's Cinerama Dome in Hollywood, California; a majority of the cast and crew were in attendance. The film was released in theaters the following day.

Home media 

The film was released on DVD and HD-DVD on May 1, 2007. The Hitcher became available on Blu-ray in Australia on December 10, 2008.

Reception

Box office
The film debuted at number 4 at the US the box office with $7,818,239 made in the opening week. After three weeks, the film placed number 11 at the box office and subsequently made $16,366,370. Five weeks after its nationwide release, The Hitcher had been pulled from most screens and was completely removed from cinemas after nine weeks. The Hitcher began its international release on March 1, 2007. As of June 30, 2009, the film has had a lifetime gross of $25.4 million.

Critical reception 

, the film holds a 19% approval rating on the review aggregator Rotten Tomatoes, based on 108 reviews with an average rating of 3.84/10. The website's critics consensus reads: "Sean Bean tries giving motive and emotion to The Hitcher, but director Dave Meyers is more interested in cheap shocks, and gratuitous gore and torture". On Metacritic, the film has a rating of 28/100, based on 16 reviews, indicating "generally unfavorable reviews". Empire Magazine gave the film two stars and said that the picture was totally inferior to the original. The Guardian said: "Don't even slow down for this one, certainly don't tag along for the ride". New York Post called it "the Jessica Simpson of psycho killer flicks – cheerfully in touch with its own brainlessness".

Accolades

References

External links
 
 
 
 
 

2007 films
2007 horror films
2000s English-language films
2000s horror thriller films
American horror thriller films
Films about road accidents and incidents
Films set in New Mexico
Films shot in New Mexico
Films about hitchhiking
Remakes of American films
Horror film remakes
American serial killer films
Platinum Dunes films
Rogue (company) films
Films scored by Steve Jablonsky
Films produced by Michael Bay
Films produced by Bradley Fuller
Films produced by Andrew Form
Intrepid Pictures films
Films directed by Dave Meyers (director)
2000s American films